Profitis is a village and a community of the Volvi municipality. Before the 2011 local government reform, it was part of the municipality of Egnatia, of which it was a municipal district. The 2011 census recorded 935 inhabitants in the village and 996 in the community. The community of Profitis covers an area of 48.806 km2.

According to the statistics of Vasil Kanchov ("Macedonia, Ethnography and Statistics"), 450 Greek Christians lived in the village in 1900.

Administrative division
The community of Profitis consists of two separate settlements: 
Mikrokomi (population 61)
Profitis (population 935)
The aforementioned populations are as of 2011.

See also
 List of settlements in the Thessaloniki regional unit

References

Populated places in Thessaloniki (regional unit)